Anastasiya Sergeyevna Prilepa (also Anastassiya Prilepa, ; born March 15, 1990) is a Kazakh swimmer, who specialized in backstroke events. She is a multiple-time Kazakhstan champion in all backstroke distances, and holds two titles at the Asian Age Group Championships.

Prilepa qualified for the women's 100 m backstroke, as Kazakhstan's youngest swimmer (aged 14), at the 2004 Summer Olympics in Athens. She cleared a FINA B-standard entry time of 1:05.43 from the Kazakhstan Open Championships in Almaty. She challenged seven other swimmers in heat two, including Uzbekistan's Olga Gnedovskaya, who shared the same age with Prilepa. She raced to seventh place by a 3.18-second margin behind winner Kiera Aitken of Bermuda in 1:07.55. Prilepa failed to advance into the semifinals, as she placed thirty-eighth overall in the preliminaries.

References

External links
Profile – Kazakhstan Swimming Federation

1990 births
Living people
Kazakhstani female backstroke swimmers
Olympic swimmers of Kazakhstan
Swimmers at the 2004 Summer Olympics
Sportspeople from Almaty